Waymire is a surname. Notable people with the surname include:

Edward C. Waymire, American mathematician
Frederick Waymire (1807–1873), American farmer and politician
Kellie Waymire (1967–2003), American actress